Inday Ba (10 August 1972 – 20 April 2005), also known as N'Deaye Ba, was a Swedish-British film, stage, and television actress of Senegalese descent born in Gothenburg, Sweden.

One of her most notable Swedish on-screen roles was as Hillevi in the romantic comedy Klassfesten (2002) opposite Björn Kjellman. She appeared in Trial & Retribution as "DC Lisa West" from 2002 until 2003.

She died from kidney failure and other complications of lupus at age 32, shortly after filming her last role in the ITV drama serial Jericho. Ba, along with her mother, filmed the progression of the disease in the documentary The Wolf Inside.

She was cremated at Mortlake Crematorium and her ashes were scattered off the Swedish coast.

References

External links

Swedish stage actresses
Swedish film actresses
Swedish television actresses
Swedish people of Senegalese descent
Swedish emigrants to the United Kingdom
1972 births
2005 deaths
Deaths from lupus